The De la Roche family is a French noble family named for La Roche-sur-l'Ognon that founded the Duchy of Athens of the early 13th century.

People
Alice de la Roche, (Unknown-1282) Lady of Beirut, Regent of Beirut 
Guy I de la Roche, (1205–1263) Frankish Duke of Athens
Guy II de la Roche, (1280 – 1308) Frankish Duke of Athens
Isabella de la Roche, (died c.1291) Daughter of Guy I de la Roche and wife of Geoffrey of Briel
Jacqueline de la Roche (died c.1329) baroness of Veligosti and Damala in 1308-1329, from 1311 in co-regency with her spouse.
John I de la Roche (died 1280) Frankish Duke of Athens, succeeding his father; Guy I de la Roche 
Othon de la Roche (died c.1234) First Frankish Lord and Duke of Athens
Renaud de la Roche, father of Jacqueline de la Roche
William de la Roche (lord of Veligosti) Baron of Veligosti and Damala in the Principality of Achaea, and a relative of the ruling Dukes of Athens of the de la Roche family.
William I de la Roche (died 1287) succeeded his brother, John I de la Roche, as Duke of Athens in 1280.

References

Bibliography
 James Rennell Rodd, The Princes of Achaia and the Chronicles of Morea: A Study of Greece in the Middle Ages, 1907, v. II, p. 314, "The De La Roches of Athens", —considered outdated